John Wayne "Buzzy" Connors (born January 30, 1936) is a Canadian politician. He represented the electoral district of Cape Breton Centre in the Nova Scotia House of Assembly from 1988 to 1989. He was a member of the Nova Scotia Liberal Party.

Born in 1936 at New Waterford, Nova Scotia, Connors is a graduate of St. Francis Xavier University. He served as a town councillor in New Waterford from 1982 to 1985. He entered provincial politics in the 1988 election, winning the Cape Breton Centre riding by 1,471 votes. He served as MLA until February 1989, when he resigned for health reasons.

References

Living people
1936 births
Nova Scotia Liberal Party MLAs
People from New Waterford, Nova Scotia
St. Francis Xavier University alumni
Nova Scotia municipal councillors